The New York Idea is a 1920 American silent comedy film directed by Herbert Blache and starring Alice Brady. The film was produced and distributed by Realart Pictures, an Adolph Zukor affiliate of his bigger Paramount Pictures.

The film is based on a 1906 Broadway play by Langdon Mitchell that starred Mrs. Fiske and George Arliss. Prints of the film exist at the International House of Photography, George Eastman House and the BFI National Archive, London.

Cast
Alice Brady - Cynthia Karslake
Lowell Sherman - John Karslake
Hedda Hopper - Vida Phillimore
George Howell - Judge Philip Phillimore
Lionel Pape - Sir Wilfrid Darby
Margaret Linden - Caroline Dwight
Edwards Davis - Bishop Matthew Phillimore (billed as Edward Davis)
Harry Hocky - Tim Fiddler
Nina Herbert - Mrs. Fiddler
Emily Fitzroy - Grace Phillimore
Julia Hurley - Mrs. Phillimore
Marie Burke - Miss Heneage
Robert Vivian - Brooks
Edgar Norton - Thomas
George Stevens - Butler

References

External links

The New York Idea; allmovie.com
Stills: picture 1 (with Lionel Pape, Alice Brady, Hedda Hopper, and Lowell Sherman), and picture #2 (with Alice Brady and Lionel Pape)
The New York Idea lantern slide; coming attractions

1920 films
American silent feature films
Films directed by Herbert Blaché
American films based on plays
Silent American comedy films
1920 comedy films
American black-and-white films
1920s American films